RK Tekstilec (HC Tekstilec) is a team handball club from Štip, North Macedonia. They won the Macedonian First Handball League in the 2011-12 season and got promoted to the VIP Super League.

In 2011, “Tekstilec” from Štip won the state championship handball title in the cadet category. In the finals the team from Štip defeated the handball players of “Metalurg” with a result of 21:19 and stopped them to win the tenth title this season. The success was big and this handball club is continuously achieving top results.

Former club members

Notable former players
  Martin Popovski

References

External links
RFM Profile
Macedonian Handball Federation
Штип, Спортски вести

Tekstilec
Sport in Štip